Chicholi railway station serves Chicholi and nearby area in Bhandara district in Maharashtra, India.

Bhandara district
Railway stations in Bhandara district
Nagpur SEC railway division